The 2006 NESTEA European Championship Tour (or the 2006 European Beach Volleyball Tour) was the European beach volleyball tour for 2006.

The tour consisted of six tournaments with both genders, including the 2006 Championship Final.

Tournaments
Nestea Turkish Masters, in Alanya, Turkey – 17–21 May 2006
Nestea German Masters, in Hamburg, Germany – 31 May – 3 June 2006
Nestea Russian Masters, in Moscow, Russia – 15–18 June 2006
Nestea Spanish Masters, in Valencia, Spain – 20–23 July 2006
Nestea Swiss Masters, in Lucerne, Switzerland – 5–8 August 2006
2006 Nestea European Championship Final, in The Hague, Netherlands – 25–28 August 2006

Tournament results

Women

Men

Medal table by country

References

 

European
Nestea European Championship Tour